Rose House may refer to the following historic houses:

Rufus M. Rose House, Atlanta, Georgia
David Garland Rose House, Valparaiso, Indiana
Robert H. Rose House, Binghamton, New York
William H. Rose House, Stony Point, New York
Thomas Rose House, Charleston, South Carolina